Concordia Junior-Senior High School is a public secondary school in Concordia, Kansas, United States operated by Concordia USD 333, and serves students of grades 7 to 12.  It is called the "Junior-Senior" high school because the junior high school (grades 7–8) and senior high school (grades 9-12) are housed in the same building complex.

Facilities

The junior high and senior high for the district are housed in the same building but are run as separate schools.  Each "school" has its own principal and academic teaching departments.  Functionally the two schools are different but simply housed in the same building.  Shared facilities include the cafeteria, the music rooms, and gymnasiums.  The school also has an indoor swimming pool.  Additionally, selected teachers do "cross-over" between junior and senior high classes (such as music and art instruction), but the administration seeks to keep the practice to a minimum.

The junior high students normally enter the building from the southeast entrance while the high school students enter the building from multiple entrances on the west side of the complex.  This is in relationship to the general location of student lockers and common areas.

Most schools in North America have either a "junior high" or a "middle" schools, the Concordia district is rare in that the school district has both a junior high (grades 7–8) and a middle school (grades 5–6).  Most school districts have one or the other but not both.

Extracurricular activities

Athletics
Concordia Junior-Senior High School competes in the North Central Kansas League and are known as the "Panthers".  Concordia Junior-Senior High School offers the following sports:

Fall
 Football
 Volleyball
 Boys' Cross-Country
 Girls' Cross-Country
 Girls' Golf
 Girls' Tennis

Winter
 Boys' Basketball
 Girls' Basketball
 Wrestling

Spring
 Baseball
 Boys' Golf
 Boys' Tennis
 Softball
 Boys' Track and Field
 Girls' Track and Field

Activities
A wide collection of activities are available to students at the school:

Clubs
 FFA
 FHA
 National Honors Society
 various other clubs and organizations

Arts
 Band
 Choir
 Dramatic arts

Competitive activities
 Debate
 Forensics

Notable people

Alumni
 Amber Campbell, recipient of National Science Foundation Graduate Research Fellowship Award and DNA/Paleopathology researcher 
 Keith Christensen, former NFL Football Player New Orleans Saints
 Jim Garver, country music guitarist
 Mike Gardner, collegiate head football coach at Tabor College and later at Malone College (7th grade only)
 Tim McCarty, collegiate football coach
 Bill Dotson, Three time American record holder in the 1 mile run, inducted into the Kansas Sports Hall of Fame.
 Robert E. Pearson, movie director
 Ernie Quigley, professional basketball referee and as an umpire in Major League Baseball
 Kaye Vaughan, former Canadian Football League and Hall of Fame player with the Ottawa Rough Riders, winner CFL's Outstanding Lineman Award

Faculty
 Tom Brosius, track & field athlete and coach
 Larry Hartshorn, former NFL football player Chicago Cardinals
 Pop Hollinger, pioneer of the industry of comic book collection and trading

See also
 List of high schools in Kansas
 List of unified school districts in Kansas

References

External links
 School website
 District website

Public high schools in Kansas
Schools in Cloud County, Kansas
Public middle schools in Kansas